Liphamola is a community council located in the Mokhotlong District of Lesotho. Its population in 2006 was 8,215.

Villages
The community of Liphamola includes the villages of Airport, Chaba-se-maketse, Checha, Ha Kotsiea, Ha Mojakisane, Ha Seeiso (Thabang), Kamor'a-Lekhalo, Koporasi, Lecop, Mangaung, Mapoleseng, Matamong, Matebeleng, Motse-mocha, Ntlholohetsane, Phuthalichaba, Salang, Sepetlele and Thaba-Bosiu.

References

External links
 Google map of community villages

Populated places in Mokhotlong District